Václav Edvard "Vic" Beneš (born January 1, 1931) is a Czech-American, a mathematician known for his contributions to the theory of stochastic processes, queueing theory and control theory, as well as the design of telecommunications switches.

He studied under John Kemeny and gained a doctorate in mathematics at Princeton University (1953) on a treatise on Mathematical logic.

He then worked for Bell Labs until 1986,  contributing to  Kalman filter theory as well as the Beneš network, a permutation network of the Clos network type.  In the 1980s he held a position at Columbia University as well.
He has continued to publish independently since 1989.

He was elected IEEE Fellow (1991) for "contributions to the structure of telephone connecting networks, stochastic control, and nonlinear filtering".
The Benesfest was celebrated at Columbia University (2001) to honor his 70th birthday.  He resides in Millburn, New Jersey (since 1985) where he has been a long-time mountain climber and member of the American Alpine Club, and currently heads the local historical society.

He is a relative of the former President of Czechoslovakia Edvard Beneš and politician Vojta Beneš. Emilie Benes Brzezinski, a sculptor, was his sister.

His first wife Janet was the daughter of Philip Franklin and niece of Norbert Wiener.

Books
General stochastic processes in the theory of queues (Addison-Wesley, 1963)
Mathematical Theory of Connecting Networks and Telephone Traffic (Academic Press, 1965)

Journal publications
Mr. Mayo on “Rules” of language, Philosophical Studies, 3(2):33–36, April 1951 (review).
A Partial Model for Quine's "New Foundations", The Journal of Symbolic Logic, Vol. 19, No. 3,  pp. 197–200, September 1954
On the Consistency of an Axiom of Enumerability, J. Symb. Log. 20(1):29–30, 1955
On queues with Poisson arrivals, Ann. Math. Statist., vol. 28, pp. 670–677, 1956
On Trunks with Negative Exponential Holding Times Serving a Renewal Process, Bell System Technical Journal, 37, pp. 211–258, 1958
Fluctuations of telephone traffic, Bell System Technical Journal, 38, pp. 965–974, 1959
Transition probabilities for telephone traffic, Bell System Technical Journal 38. pp. 211–258, 1959
A Sufficient Set of Statistics for a Simple Telephone Exchange Model, Bell System Technical Journal, 38, pp. 939–964, 1959
General Stochastic Processes in Traffic Systems with One Server, Bell System Technical Journal, 39, pp. 127–160, 1960
Transition Probabilities for Telephone Traffic, Bell System Technical Journal, 39, pp. 1297–1320, 1960
Covariance function of simple trunk group, with applications to traffic measurement, Bell System Technical Journal, 1961
Heuristic Remarks and Mathematical Problems Regarding the Theory of Switching Systems, Bell System Technical Journal, vol. 41, pp. 1201–1247, 1962
On Rearrangeable Three-Stage Connecting Networks, Bell System Technical Journal, vol. XLI, Sep. 1962, No. 5, pp. 1481–1491.
A "Renewal" Limit Theorem for General Stochastic processes, Ann. Math. Statist. Volume 33, Number 1,  98–113, 1962
Growth, Complexity and Performance of Telephone Connecting Networks, Bell System Technical Journal, Vol. 62, No. 3,  pp. 499–539, February 1963,
Optimal Rearrangeable Multistage Connecting Networks, Bell System Technical Journal, vol. 43, pp. 1641–1656, 1964
Permutation groups, complexes and rearrangeable connecting network, Bell System Technical Journal, 43, 4:1619–1640, 1964.
Index Reduction of FM Waves by Feed-Back and Power-Law Nonlinearities, Bell Labs Technical Journal, Vol.XLIV, No.4, pp. 581–601, April 1965
Programming and control problems arising from optimal routing in telephone networks,  SIAM Journal on Control, 4(??):6–18, 1966
Existence of finite invariant measures for Markov processes, Proc. Amer.Math. Soc., 18:1058–1061, 1967.
On some proposed models for traffic in connecting networks, Bell System Technical Journal, 46:105–116, 1967
Benes and Lawrence Shepp, Wiener Integrals Associated with Diffusion processes, Theory of Probability, 13, pages 498–501, 1968
Finite Regular Invariant Measures for Feller Processes, Journal of Applied Probability, Vol. 5, No. 1, pages 203–209, April 1968
Existence of optimal strategies based on specified information, for a class of stochastic decision problems, SIAM Journal on Control, 8(??):179–188, 1970
Existence of optimal stochastic control laws, SIAM Journal on Control 9(?):446–475, 1971
Applications of group theory to connecting networks, Bell System Technical Journal, vol.45, pp. 407–420, 1975
Proving the rearrangeability of connecting networks by group calculations, Bell System Technical Journal, vol.45, pp. 421–434, 1975
Full "bang" to reduce predicted miss is optimal, SIAM Journal on Control, 15(?):52–83, 1976
On Kailath's innovation conjecture, Bell System Technical Journal 55:7, pp. 981–1001, 1976
Nonexistence of strong nonanticipating solutions to stochastic DEs: implications for functional DEs, filtering, and control. Stochastic Processes Applied 5:3, 243–263., 1977
Reduction of network states under symmetries, Bell System Technical Journal, 57(1):111–149, 1978
Benes, Lawrence Shepp and Hans S. Witsenhausen, Some Solvable Stochastic Control Problems, Stochastics 4, 39–83, 1980
Least-Squares Estimator for Frequency Shift Position Modulation in White Noise, pp. 1289–1296, Sept. 1980
René K. Boell and V. E. Benes, Recursive non-linear estimation of a diffusion acting as the rate of an observed Poisson process, IEEE Trans. Information Theory, vol. 26: (5), pp. 561–575, 1980.Exact Finite Dimensional Filters for Certain Diffusions with Nonlinear Drift, Stochastics, 5, pp. 65–92, 1981.
Benes and Ioannis Karatzas, Estimation and control for linear, partially observable systems with non-gaussian initial distribution,  In Stochastic Processes & Applications, 14, pages 233–248, 1981
Benes and Karatzas, On the relation of Zakai equation and Mortensen's equation, SIAM Journal on Control and Optimization, 21  pp. 472–489, 1983
Benes and Karatzas, Filtering of diffusions controlled through their conditional measures, Stochastics, 13, pp. 1–23, 1984
R. A. Spanke and V. E. Benes, N-stage planar optical permutation network, Applied Optics 26, 1226–, 1987Quadratic approximation by linear systems controlled from partial observations, In Stochastic Analysis: Liber Amicorum for Moshe Zakai, Academic Press, 1991
Benes, Kurt Helmes and Raymond. W. Rishel, Pursuing a maneuvering target which uses a random process for its control, IEEE Trans. on Automatic Control, 40(2), 1995
Benes and Robert J. Elliott, Finite dimensional risk sensitive information states, I.F.A.C. Symposium on Nonlinear Control System Design, Lake Tahoe, CA,  471–476, June 1995
Benes and Robert J. Elliott, Finite-dimensional solutions of a modified Zakai equation, Mathematics of Control, Signals, and Systems, 9, 341–351, 1996Nonlinear filtering and optimal quality control'', in Journal of Applied Mathematics and Stochastic Analysis, vol. 11, no. 3, pp. 225–230, 1998.

References

20th-century American mathematicians
Queueing theorists
Fellow Members of the IEEE
Princeton University alumni
Scientists at Bell Labs
Place of birth missing (living people)
Columbia University staff
American people of Czech descent
1931 births
Living people
Control theorists
Probability theorists